Niels Peter Hillebrandt  (September 14, 1815 - February 11, 1885) was a Danish organist and composer.

See also
List of Danish composers

References
This article was initially translated from the Danish Wikipedia.

Male composers
Danish classical organists
Male classical organists
1815 births
1885 deaths
19th-century Danish composers
19th-century male musicians
19th-century organists